The Life and Times of Savior 28, is a five-issue comic book limited series by J.M. DeMatteis, with the artwork by Mike Cavallaro. It was published by IDW Publishing.

The story deals with Savior 28, a Golden Age superhero who over the course of seven decades renounces violence: "'To be... or not to be!' How can a man go on living when everything he's ever believed is revealed as a lie? That's the question Savior 28 is forced to ask as we follow him across the decades, from the ashes of Buchenwald to the ashes of 9/11 in this exploration of the dark underbelly of the super hero dream."

Publication history

Background 
In an interview, writer DeMatteis discussed the impetus for Savior 28:

Collected editions
The Life and Times of Savior 28 has been published as a trade paperback.

References

External links